The Vokalsinfonie  by Hans Werner Henze was written in 1955.  The sung text is by German writer Heinz von Cramer.

Like the fourth symphony, the Vokalsinfonie is derived from Henze's opera König Hirsch (King Stag).

It is composed for ten solo singers who perform roles from the opera:

Scollatella I - IV - Sopranos
König (King) - Tenor
Stimmen des Waldes (Voices of the Woods) - soprano, mezzo-soprano, alto, tenor and bass

and an orchestra of: 3 flutes (no. 3 doubling piccolo), 2 oboes, cor anglais, 2 clarinets, bass clarinet, 2 bassoons, contrabassoon, 4 horns, 3 trumpets, 2 trombones, tuba, glockenspiel, vibraphone, triangle, mandolin, harp, celesta, piano and strings.

It is in five movements:

Genesi (Genesis)
Introduzione e Sonata (Introduction and Sonata)
Variazioni (Variations)
Capriccio
Ricercar

A typical performance lasts approximately 20 minutes.

References

Vokalsinfonie
1955 compositions